The Christherre-Chronik (named after its opening words, "Christ the Lord") is a 13th-century world chronicle from Thüringen, written in Middle High German rhyming couplets.  It was written by a churchman in the service of Henry III, Margrave of Meissen, and may be seen as attempting a spiritual answer to the courtly world chronicle of Rudolf von Ems.  The work begins with the creation of the world and was apparently intended to follow world history until the poet's own day, but it was never finished.  It breaks off during the account of the book of judges, and in the manuscripts it is continued with text from other chronicles, including (ironically) that of Rudolf, and also sometimes the Weltchronik of Jans der Enikel.

There is still no edition of this text.  Excerpts with English translations can be found in: Graeme Dunphy (ed.), History as Literature: German World Chronicles of the Thirteenth Century in Verse. Kalamazoo 2003.

German chronicles
German books
13th-century history books